Saint-Germier is the name of several communes in France:

 Saint-Germier, Haute-Garonne in the Haute-Garonne department
 Saint-Germier, Gers, in the Gers department
 Saint-Germier, Deux-Sèvres, in the Deux-Sèvres department
 Saint-Germier, Tarn, in the Tarn department